Mariano Marquez (born April 22, 1968 in Río Piedras, Puerto Rico) is a retired professional boxer from Puerto Rico.

Career
As an amateur, Marquez represented his native country in the light heavyweight division (– 81 kg), winning a bronze medal at the 1993 Central American and Caribbean Games in Ponce, Puerto Rico. Rated as a middleweight he made his professional debut on 1995-10-28, defeating USA's Jorge Delgado in Philadelphia, Pennsylvania. He quit after 12 pro bouts (5 wins, 7 losses).

References 

 

1968 births
Living people
People from Río Piedras, Puerto Rico
Middleweight boxers
Puerto Rican male boxers
Central American and Caribbean Games bronze medalists for Puerto Rico
Competitors at the 1993 Central American and Caribbean Games
Central American and Caribbean Games medalists in boxing
20th-century Puerto Rican people